Zagore may refer to: 
 , a village Mošćenička Draga Municipality, Primorje-Gorski Kotar County, Croatia
 , a village Stara Zagora Municipality, Stara Zagora Province, Bulgaria
 Zagore (region) (also Zagora, Zagorie, Zagoriya), a region in medieval Bulgaria
 , a region in Bulgaria

See also
 
 Zagorë, a village Shkrel Municipality, Malësi e Madhe District, Shkodër County, Albania
 Zagora (disambiguation)
 Zagori (disambiguation)
 Zagorje (disambiguation)
 Záhorie, a region in Slovakia